YUX may refer to:

 YUX - The ICAO code for Hall Beach Airport
 Yux - An enemy from Paper Mario: The Thousand-Year Door